Kolincz  is a village in the administrative district of Gmina Starogard Gdański, within Starogard County, Pomeranian Voivodeship, in northern Poland.

For details of the history of the region, see History of Pomerania.

The village has a population of 375.
Between 1975-1998 The town administratively belonged to the Gdańsk Province (województwo gdańskie).
There is a Jewish cemetery in Kolincz.

References

Kolincz